Rock Music is the third and final studio album by Australian band The Superjesus. The album was released in May 2003 and peaked at number 14.

Background
Rock Music was difficult for the band to make, taking a year and a half to finish. Bass player Stuart Rudd outlined the difficulties in making the album in an interview with Inpress magazine in June 2003.  "This album is a result of a year and a half prior," Stuart Rudd begins to explain. "The ups and downs definitely… it all came to a peak when we were in London. We had forty or fifty songs written and we could not come to agree on a direction to go. Then with the departure of another guitarist (Tim Henwood) we really had to pick ourselves up off the canvas again. We realised that the songs we had been writing weren’t the ones that we wanted to do, because we were suddenly able to move as one in the direction we wanted to go. It was like a huge weight off our shoulders."

Tim Henwood left the band to form The Androids who had a top ten hit in Australia with the song "Do It with Madonna".

Track listing

Charts

Release history

References

2003 albums
Rock albums by Australian artists
The Superjesus albums